Electric Loco Shed, Ghaziabad is a motive power depot performing locomotive maintenance and repair facility for electric locomotives of the Indian Railways, located at  of the Northern Railway zone in Uttar Pradesh, India. It is one of the two electric locomotive sheds of the Northern Railway, the others being at Ludhiana (LDH) .

History 
Steam locomotive sheds used to exist at Ghaziabad until the late 1960s. After Northern Railway set a deadline to eliminate all steam locomotive operations by 1990, a push was given towards establishing electric locomotion as the primary motive power, and the Steam locomotive sheds was decommissioned. To meet the needs of exponentially increasing rail traffic on the new continuous broad-gauge lines from Delhi to rest of India with the completion of gauge conversion, the Ghaziabad was selected by Indian railways for a new electric locomotive shed.

New Electric locomotive shed was inaugurated in the late 1976s with WAM-4 which stayed until late 2009, when they were transferred to other sheds. It later got a large fleet of WAG-5 locos, but later these were then moved to Ludhiana. All WAP-1 locos from Arakkonam and Mughalsarai shed were transferred here for hauling rajdhani expresses. The brand new from ABB were directly allocated to ghaziabad after arrival in India. New WAP-7 locos were acquired in 2000s. The shed also held a single WAM-4 units which is earmarked for preservation.

Operations 
Being one of the three electric engine sheds in Northern Railway, various major and minor maintenance schedules of electric locomotives are carried out here. It has the sanctioned capacity of 200 Locos.Expansion work on Progress to 225 Locos.Total 293 Electric locos Holding at GZB ELS,including 137 WAP-5 and 155 WAP-7. It also housed a WAM-4 locomotives temporarily. Electric loco Shed, Ghaziabad is now housing the  largest fleet of WAP-5 in Indian Railways and it caters to many long-distance electric trains.

Like all locomotive sheds, GZB does regular maintenance, overhaul and repair including painting and washing of locomotives. It not only attends to locomotives housed at GZB but to ones coming in from other sheds as well. It has four pit lines for loco repair. Locomotives of Ghaziabad ELS  were the regular links for all trains running through Delhi when widespread electrification of railway lines started in Northern Railways. It handled prestigious trains like the Mumbai Rajdhani Express. GZB locomotives used to be predominantly the regular links for trains traveling to east as well.

Locomotives

References

External links 

 Website
 Particulars
 maps of Indian Railway Loco Sheds
 showing the ghaziabad Electric Loco Shed

Ghaziabad
Ghaziabad, Uttar Pradesh
Rail infrastructure in Uttar Pradesh
Buildings and structures in Ghaziabad, Uttar Pradesh
1976 establishments in Uttar Pradesh